This is a list of Panzerkampfwagen V Panther variants, including prototypes, conversions and projected designs.

Production models 

Data from:

Ausf. D
The first production series, (despite the designation), built by MAN, Daimler-Benz,  MNH and Henschel. 850 built between January to September 1943.

Ausf. A (Panther I, VK3002, Sd.Kfz.171)
The second production series, (despite the designation), built by MAN, Daimler-Benz, Demag and MNH. 2,000 built between August 1943 to May 1944.
Ausf. G
The third production series, (despite the designation), built by MAN, Daimler-Benz,  MNH. 3,126 built between March 1944 to April 1945.
Panzerbefehlswagen mit 7.5 cm KwK42 L/70
Panzerkampfwagen Panther (Sd.Kfz.171) (als Pz.Bef.Wg.)  /  Panzerbefehlswagen Panther Ausf. A (Sd.Kfz. 267)
329 converted with extra radio equipment and reduced ammunition storage.
Panzerbeobachtungswagen Panther
This artillery observation tank was converted from Panther Is by removing the main armament and fitting a dummy gun with a ball fitting for a machine gun on the blanked off turret front. 41 were converted late 1944 - early 1945.
Jagdpanther (Sd.Kfz.173)
Panzerjäger für 8.8cm PaK43 auf Fgst Panther I. A tank destroyer based on the Panther chassis with a 8.8cm PaK43 L/71 fitted to a fixed superstructure in a limited traverse mounting. 392 built by MIAG and MNH from January 1944 to March 1945.
Panzer-Bergegerät (Panther I) (Sd.Kfz.179)
Bergepanther armoured recovery vehicles using the Panther I chassis. 347 built or converted by Henschel, MAN and Demag.

Pilot models, prototypes and experimental designs
Data from:

VK 30.01 (D)
A prototype for the Panther from Daimler-Benz, closely following the T-34. The MAN design, however, was selected for production.

VK 30.02 (D)
A second prototype for the Panther from Daimler-Benz. The MAN design, however, was selected for production.Pz.Kpfw.V Ausf. F neuer Art'Development of the Schmalturm (small turret) was underway at the end of the war with prototype turrets completed. The Schmalturm'' was to have been fitted to the Ausf.F and the Panther II.

Panzerkampfwagen Panther II
An up-armoured Panther with revised suspension. Only two prototypes were completed before the end of the war and the Panther II was superseded by the E-50.

Geschützwagen Panther für sFH18/4 (Sf) (Gerät 811)
A weapon carrier / self-propelled artillery with de-mountable 15cm sFH18/4 heavy field howitzer. The sole prototype was completed by Daimler-Benz just before the war ended in 1945.

Jagdpanther Starr
A tank destroyer with rigidly mounted 8.8cm PaK43/1 L/71 under development by Krupp at war's end.

Sturmpanther
A projected assault tank mounting a 15 cm StuH43/1. Production was not started before the war ended.

Flakpanther 8.8 cm
Designs were laid for a Flakpanther mounting an 8.8cm FlaK 41 in an armoured turret.

Flakzwilling 3.7 cm auf Panther Fahrgestell "Flakpanzer Coelian" (Gerät 554)
A Flakpanzer project started in December 1943 mounting a double 3.7cm FlaK 43 in an armored turret. At least one wooden mock-up was completed but production was delayed repeatedly.

Flakzwilling 5.5 cm Coelian "Mammut"
An upgrade to the Flakpanzer Coelian mounting a dual 5.5 cm Flakzwilling.

Gerät 5-1028
A Rheinmetall weapon carrier design mounting a 10.5 cm leFH 18 on a chassis derived from the Panther.

Gerät 5-1211
A Krupp weapon carrier design mounting a 12.8 cm Kanone 43.

Gerät 5-1213 "Skorpion"
A Rheinmetall weapon carrier design mounting a 12.8 cm Kanone 43.

Gerät 5-1228
A Krupp weapon carrier design mounting a 15cm sFH18.

References

External links

Medium tanks of Germany
Military vehicles introduced from 1940 to 1944
World War II medium tanks
World War II tanks of Germany